Raúl García (born 21 September 1959) is a Peruvian footballer. He played in two matches for the Peru national football team in 1984. He was also part of Peru's squad for the 1983 Copa América tournament.

References

External links
 

1959 births
Living people
Peruvian footballers
Peru international footballers
Place of birth missing (living people)
Association football defenders